James Stynes OAM (23 April 196620 March 2012) was an Irish-born footballer who converted from Gaelic football to Australian rules football. Playing for the Melbourne Football Club in the Australian Football League (AFL), he went on to become one of the game's most prominent figures, breaking the record for most consecutive games of VFL/AFL football (244) and winning the sport's highest individual honour, the Brownlow Medal, in 1991. Off the field, he was a notable AFL administrator, philanthropist, charity worker and writer.

Career

During his 264-game career playing for the Melbourne Football Club in the Australian Football League (AFL) between 1987 and 1998, Stynes became the first and only non-Australian-born VFL/AFL player to win the Brownlow Medal, which he achieved in 1991.

After his retirement, he was inducted into the Australian Football Hall of Fame. Stynes was quite famous in both Australia and Ireland as a result of his involvement in the Melbourne Football Club's international recruitment program (now known as the "Irish experiment"). Born in Dublin, Ireland, where he was a promising Gaelic footballer at the Ballyboden St Enda's club, Stynes made a move to Australia at the age of 18 following his county team's victory in the 1984 All-Ireland Minor Football Championship.

Debuting in the Australian Football League in 1987, he played an unbeaten league record of 244 consecutive games between 1987 and 1998 as a mobile ruckman. Along with his Brownlow Medal, his Australian Rules achievements included the Leigh Matthews Trophy, two-time All-Australian team selection, a Grand Final appearance in 1988, and a four-time winner of the Keith 'Bluey' Truscott Medal for being judged Melbourne's best player throughout the course of a season. He also represented Victoria in interstate football matches, and he played for both Australia and Ireland in international rules football, a hybrid of Gaelic football and Australian rules football.

Following his football career, Stynes focused on youth work, using his profile to launch The Reach Foundation, which he co-founded in 1994. As a result of his work with young people in Victoria, he was named Victorian of the Year twice, in 2001 and 2003, and with the expanded profile of Reach nationally, awarded the Medal of the Order of Australia in 2007.

Stynes also served as president of the Melbourne Football Club from 2008 and was involved in fundraising efforts which brought the club out of debt. In 2009, Stynes was diagnosed with metastatic melanoma and continued to work during his treatment for brain metastasis. He died in March 2012 and was honoured by a state funeral held at St Paul's Cathedral in Melbourne on 27 March 2012.

Early life
Stynes was born in Dublin, Ireland, to a Roman Catholic family, the eldest son of Brian and Teresa Stynes, one of six siblings. 
He grew up in Rathfarnham.

He attended Ballyroan Boys National School. He began playing Gaelic football at the age of eight. From age nine, he played at Ballyboden St Enda's at under-11s level. He attended high school at De La Salle College, Churchtown, where he played rugby union while continuing to play Gaelic football for his club alongside his younger brother, Brian.

His first exposure to Australian rules football was watching the 1980 film The Club on television. Stynes represented Dublin in 1984, at the age of eighteen, and was on Dublin's winning side in the All-Ireland Minor Football Championship.

Stynes aspired to a college education; however, he lacked the means and was earning just $10 a week delivering newspapers.

Later in his life, he graduated with a Bachelor of Social Science degree and a Diploma in Youth Work from RMIT University; additionally, he earned a Bachelor of Education degree from Deakin University. He was later awarded with the honorary degree of Doctor of the University from the Australian Catholic University.

Switch to Australian rules football

In 1984, Stynes responded to an advertisement in his local paper placed by the Melbourne Football Club that offered two scholarships with all expenses paid to play Australian rules football and attend university in Victoria, Australia. Applicants were required to be under 18, over 183 cm and at county standard.

Tall and slim, Stynes was selected, along with James Fahey, and brought to Victoria to undergo a crash course in Australian rules. He signed a two-year contract, hoping to use the money to fund his way through college. Stynes was promised accommodation with an additional $60 weekly stipend, clothing, and $50 a game. He arrived in Australia on 7 November 1984.

Stynes debuted for the Melbourne under-19s team in 1985 and finished the season runner-up in the best and fairest. Ray Jordon, a coach who was experienced with talented juniors, worked intensively with Stynes, and he was sent to Victorian Football Association's Prahran Football Club to compete at senior level.

VFL/AFL career

Stynes made his senior debut for the Melbourne Demons in 1987 against Geelong at Kardinia Park. Two weeks later, he played in the Night Series Final against the Essendon Bombers. The Demons' thrilling 4-point victory over the Bombers gave the club its first silverware in 23 years.

Later in 1987, Stynes was part of the senior side which won their last six matches of the home-and-away season to finish in 5th place and qualify for Melbourne's first finals series since 1964. The Demons were cast as a Cinderella team, winning their first two finals by huge margins in front of huge, frenzied crowds. They were just seconds away from an unlikely Grand Final appearance, leading Hawthorn in the Preliminary Final by 4 points when a free kick was awarded to Gary Buckenara fifty metres from goal. Stynes ran through the mark as the final siren sounded; it was an error which resulted in a 15-metre penalty and brought the Hawk forward within range. Buckenara scored the goal, giving his team a two-point win and ending Melbourne's fairytale charge to the premiership. (n.b. the 15-metre penalty rule was increased to 50 metres in 1988.)

Stynes managed to put this costly mistake behind him. He cemented his position in Melbourne's senior team in 1988 and drew praise for his consistent play and for his innate skills and ability. He played in all 26 games, including the Grand Final versus Hawthorn. Despite his team losing to the Hawks by 96 points, Stynes performed admirably and he was judged to be Melbourne's best player that day.

In 1991, Stynes enjoyed the finest individual season of his career. With his fitness level at an all-time high and four years of experience under his belt, he took his game to another level, dominating the season with a league-best 214 marks. Many of these were taken thanks to his canny reading of the play. He repeatedly intercepted the opposition's long kicks forward with towering marks across the half-back line. He was installed as a hot favourite to win the Brownlow Medal after averaging an astounding 30.6 disposals and 11 marks per game over the final 8 rounds. Stynes polled 25 votes to win the 1991 Brownlow Medal, five votes clear of his nearest rivals. He remains the only non-Australian-born player to receive game's most prestigious individual honour. He was also awarded the AFL Players Association MVP trophy, was named the All-Australian ruckman, and won his first club best-and-fairest award for Melbourne.

Media commentators noted that Stynes had used his extraordinary endurance to redefine the role of the professional ruckman. While many of his opponents were over 2 metres tall, Stynes played in the style of a tall ruck rover. Instead of focusing on hitouts and playing in bursts, he ran the whole game and gained possession across the entire ground. This was a model of play which many other mid-sized ruckmen such as Geelong and Essendon's John Barnes were able to successfully follow.

An exceptional run of consecutive games which had begun in Round 18 of 1987 almost ended with a severe rib injury in 1993 that Stynes sustained from a collision with teammate David Neitz in a match against the North Melbourne Football Club. He was treated at Epworth Hospital for a compound rib fracture. Despite being ruled out by medical officers for six weeks, he convinced his coach Neil Balme to pass him in the club fitness test and wore a chest guard in order to play the following Friday night.

Stynes finished the season with his consecutive games record unblemished and achieved All-Australian selection for the second time. In 1994, he suffered a medial ligament tear but continued to play through it, going on to string together three fine seasons between 1995 and 1997 in which he won consecutive club champion awards. In Round 9, 1996, Stynes played his 205th consecutive game, breaking the 53-year record held by Jack Titus since 1943.

Stynes broke his hand early in the 1998 season, effectively ending his streak of consecutive games finally at 244. He retired from professional football at the conclusion of the season, having played a total of 264 AFL games, all at Melbourne, placing him second on the club's all-time games tally at the time.

Statistics

|- style="background:#eaeaea;"
! scope="row" style="text-align:center" | 1987
|
| 37 || 13 || 15 || 10 || 116 || 45 || 161 || 48 || 8 || 114 || 1.2 || 0.8 || 8.9 || 3.5 || 12.4 || 3.7 || 0.6 || 8.8
|-
! scope="row" style="text-align:center" | 1988
|
| 11 || 26 || 26 || 13 || 316 || 107 || 423 || 135 || 21 || 196 || 1.0 || 0.5 || 12.2 || 4.1 || 16.3 || 5.2 || 0.8 || 7.5
|- style="background:#eaeaea;"
! scope="row" style="text-align:center" | 1989
|
| 11 || 24 || 17 || 14 || 327 || 112 || 439 || 119 || 26 || 254 || 0.7 || 0.6 || 13.6 || 4.7 || 18.3 || 5.0 || 1.1 || 10.6
|-
! scope="row" style="text-align:center" | 1990
|
| 11 || 24 || 11 || 8 || 306 || 129 || 435 || 125 || 25 || 258 || 0.5 || 0.3 || 12.8 || 5.4 || 18.1 || 5.2 || 1.0 || 10.8
|- style="background:#eaeaea;"
! scope="row" style="text-align:center" | 1991
|
| 11 || 24 || 15 || 10 || 382 || 232 || 614 || style="background:#dd6e81;"| 214 || 11 || 256 || 0.6 || 0.4 || 15.9 || 9.7 || 25.6 || style="background:#dd6e81;"| 8.9 || 0.5 || 10.7
|-
! scope="row" style="text-align:center" | 1992
|
| 11 || 22 || 9 || 3 || 334 || 180 || 514 || 166 || 13 || 335 || 0.4 || 0.1 || 15.2 || 8.2 || 23.4 || 7.5 || 0.6 || 15.2
|- style="background:#eaeaea;"
! scope="row" style="text-align:center" | 1993
|
| 11 || 20 || 6 || 8 || 265 || 179 || 444 || 123 || 6 || 264 || 0.3 || 0.4 || 13.3 || 9.0 || 22.2 || 6.2 || 0.3 || 13.2
|-
! scope="row" style="text-align:center" | 1994
|
| 11 || 25 || 10 || 8 || 241 || 179 || 420 || 126 || 16 || 269 || 0.4 || 0.3 || 9.6 || 7.2 || 16.8 || 5.0 || 0.6 || 10.8
|- style="background:#eaeaea;"
! scope="row" style="text-align:center" | 1995
|
| 11 || 22 || 9 || 3 || 264 || 137 || 401 || 134 || 15 || 242 || 0.4 || 0.1 || 12.0 || 6.2 || 18.2 || 6.1 || 0.7 || 11.0
|-
! scope="row" style="text-align:center" | 1996
|
| 11 || 22 || 7 || 10 || 267 || 182 || 449 || 144 || 26 || 349 || 0.3 || 0.5 || 12.1 || 8.3 || 20.4 || 6.5 || 1.2 || 15.9
|- style="background:#eaeaea;"
! scope="row" style="text-align:center" | 1997
|
| 11 || 22 || 3 || 4 || 279 || 172 || 451 || 126 || 16 || 320 || 0.1 || 0.2 || 12.7 || 7.8 || 20.5 || 5.7 || 0.7 || 14.5
|-
! scope="row" style="text-align:center" | 1998
|
| 11 || 20 || 2 || 6 || 145 || 89 || 234 || 56 || 6 || 253 || 0.1 || 0.3 || 7.3 || 4.5 || 11.7 || 2.8 || 0.3 || 12.7
|- class="sortbottom"
! colspan=3| Career
! 264
! 130
! 97
! 3242
! 1743
! 4985
! 1516
! 189
! 3110
! 0.5
! 0.4
! 12.3
! 6.6
! 18.9
! 5.7
! 0.7
! 11.8
|}

Honours and achievements

Team
Night Series Premiership (Melbourne): 1987
Individual
Brownlow Medal: 1991
Keith 'Bluey' Truscott Medal: 1991, 1995–1997
Leigh Matthews Trophy (AFLPA MVP Award): 1991
All-Australian: 1991, 1993
Herald Sun Player of the Year Award: 1991
Melbourne F.C. Team of the Century
Australian Football Hall of Fame inductee: 2003

Youth work and founding of Reach
In 1994, Stynes co-founded (with film director Paul Currie) The Reach Foundation and became a prominent youth worker in Victoria.

In addition to Reach, Stynes worked on government advisory boards, including the 1997 Victorian Government Suicide Task Force and the Federal Minister For Youth's Youth Advisory Consultative Forum Committee.

Writer
Stynes authored several books. His written works include two autobiographies: Whatever It Takes (1996) with Jim Main and My Journey (2012) with Warwick Green, along with children's self-help books co-written by Dr Jon Carnegie, including Heroes (2003) and Finding Heroes (2006).

Melbourne Football Club chairman
In 2008, Stynes began expressing an interest in becoming chairman. In June 2008, Melbourne's chairman, Paul Gardner, stepped down as president to make way for Stynes.

His early-stated main goal at this stage was to increase the Melbourne membership number—especially the junior membership base as stated on The Footy Show on 12 June 2008. Shortly following his election, he declared his staunch stance against any proposed relocation of the club to the Gold Coast or elsewhere.

In March 2011, Stynes met Prince William, Duke of Cambridge in Kerang, teaching him basic Australian rules football skills.

In July 2011, Stynes in his role as chairman announced the sacking of Dean Bailey as Melbourne Football Club senior coach after a club board meeting due to an embarrassing 186 point lost to Geelong in Round 19, 2011, when Stynes said he found it extremely hard to tell Bailey of the club's decision in stating  "It wasn't something I was looking forward to," and "It makes it hard, because Dean Bailey is such a great man and a man of integrity".
  
In December 2011, Stynes handed his #11 guernsey to new recruit Mitch Clark.
In February 2012, Stynes stepped down from the presidency of Melbourne, citing a desire to devote his energies towards his family and wellbeing. He was succeeded by his vice-president, Don McLardy.

Honours and awards
The Jim Stynes Medal was named in Stynes's honour and first awarded in 1998 to the best Australian player in the International Rules series. The Jim Stynes Cup (also known as the Jim Stynes trophy) was named in Stynes' honour and awarded to the winner of the inaugural International Australian Football Youth Tournament.

In 2000, Stynes received an Australian Sports Medal and was named in Melbourne Football Club's Team of the Century. In 2001, he received the Centenary Medal "for establishing and leading a Reach organisation for youth development" and was named Victorian of the Year.

In 2003, Stynes was inducted into the Australian Football Hall of Fame and was named Victorian of the Year. In 2006, during the redevelopment of the Melbourne Cricket Ground, a new corporate dining and function room in level 2 of the Olympic Stand was named the "Jim Stynes Room" in honour of Stynes.

In 2007, he was awarded the Medal of the Order of Australia for his work with youth and contribution to Australian rules football.

Stynes was named Melburnian of the Year for 2010 for his Reach Foundation work. He was named a Doctor of the University by the Australian Catholic University in recognition of his social work.

Illness
On 2 July 2009, Stynes held a media conference to inform the public that he had developed cancer. A lump in his back was shown to be melanoma, and tests revealed that his cancer had metastasised, i.e. spread to other regions in his body. Stynes intended to make clear that he was not stepping down from his role as President of the Melbourne Football Club but instead just taking a break to seek treatment.

On 4 April 2010, it was revealed that his condition had worsened, and three days later he had surgery for brain metastasis. He continued to work during his treatment and participated in the filming of a television documentary about his life and his battle with cancer, Every Heart Beats True: The Jim Stynes Story, produced by friends Jules Lund and Reach co-founder Paul Currie which aired on 19 September 2010 on the Nine Network.

Death
Stynes died at his home in St Kilda on 20 March 2012, aged 45. He was cremated, and his ashes were scattered at a "treasured spot" he chose before he died.

Reactions to death and legacy

Ted Baillieu, the Premier of Victoria, described Stynes as "an exceptional Victorian", and he later offered a state funeral to Stynes' family, which was accepted.

The memorial was held at St Paul's Cathedral (an Anglican cathedral, although Stynes was Roman Catholic) in central Melbourne on 27 March 2012, with the service shown on screen at Federation Square.

Former teammate and captain Garry Lyon gave an emotional tribute to Stynes on The Footy Show, saying: "Jimmy refused to let the game define who he was. It was just a part of him and it allowed us to marvel at his determination, unwavering self-belief, resilience, strength, skill, endurance and courage" and that his good friend "was secure enough to know that displaying vulnerability can be a strength and not a weakness".

A moment of silence was observed at the Melbourne Cricket Ground on the day of Stynes' death, and both the Melbourne Football Club and the Casey Scorpions unveiled its  plan to commemorate Stynes at their first home games in 2012.

At the launch of the 2012 Australian Football League season, both Stynes' replacement as president of the Melbourne Football Club, Don McLardy, and the AFL's chief executive officer, Andrew Demetriou, acknowledged his contribution to football in Australia.

A minute's silence was observed before the season-opening Sydney Derby between the Greater Western Sydney Giants and Sydney Swans.

A commemoration was held prior to Dublin's National Football League match against Donegal, both of which were held on the Saturday after Stynes' death.

Melbourne ruck and captain Max Gawn paid tribute to Stynes, among other deceased club identities, in a post-match interview upon the club winning the 2021 AFL Grand Final. Stynes presented Gawn with his number 37 before Gawn's debut in 2011, and Gawn later switched to the number 11 jumper just as Stynes had done.

The Jim Stynes Achievement Scholarships—an A$3 million 5-year partnership with the Australian government, Reach Foundation and Australian Football League for children of indigenous or multicultural backgrounds, or from disadvantaged backgrounds—was announced following Stynes' death.

Personal life
Stynes' family has a strong history in Gaelic football. His uncle Joe Stynes was an All-Ireland Gaelic footballer with Dublin (1923). His younger brother Brian won an All-Ireland with Dublin (1995). Jim played against Brian in the International Rules Series against Ireland many times. Brian followed Jim to play professional Australian Rules at Melbourne; however, he returned to Ireland having played just 2 senior games in 1992.

Another younger brother, David, also played both Gaelic football and Australian rules, albeit at an amateur level, having played in the Ireland national Australian rules football team. He was the first player to win the cup twice, being a member of the winning team in the 2002 International Cup and 2011 International Cup. His cousin Chris Stynes is a former Major League Baseball utility player.

Family
Jim Stynes and his wife, Samantha, had a daughter, Matisse, and a son, Tiernan.

See also
 List of players who have converted from one football code to another
 Jim Stynes Bridge
 Jim Stynes Medal

References

External links

Melbourne Football Club profile

1966 births
2012 deaths
All-Australians (AFL)
Australian Football Hall of Fame inductees
VFL/AFL players born outside Australia
Australia international rules football team players
Ballyboden St Enda's Gaelic footballers
Brownlow Medal winners
Deaths from cancer in Victoria (Australia)
Deaths from melanoma
Dublin Gaelic footballers
Gaelic footballers who switched code
Irish emigrants to Australia
Irish players of Australian rules football
Irish rugby union players
Keith 'Bluey' Truscott Trophy winners
Leigh Matthews Trophy winners
Melbourne Football Club players
Melbourne Football Club presidents
People from Rathfarnham
Sportspeople from South Dublin (county)
Prahran Football Club players
Recipients of the Australian Sports Medal
Recipients of the Centenary Medal
Recipients of the Medal of the Order of Australia
RMIT University alumni
Jim
Victorian State of Origin players